The 2001 Conference USA men's basketball tournament was held March 7–10 at Freedom Hall in Louisville, Kentucky.

 defeated Cincinnati in the championship game, 80–72, to clinch their second Conference USA men's tournament championship.

The 49ers, in turn, received an automatic bid to the 2001 NCAA tournament. They were joined in the tournament by fellow C-USA member Cincinnati, who earned an at-large bid.

Format
There were no new changes to the tournament format. The top four teams were given byes into the quarterfinal round while the remaining eight teams were placed into the first round. All seeds were determined by overall regular season conference records.

UNC Charlotte rebranded itself as Charlotte prior to the season.

Bracket

References

Conference USA men's basketball tournament
Tournament
Conference USA men's basketball tournament
Conference USA men's basketball tournament
Basketball competitions in Louisville, Kentucky